Danielle Smith (born 1971) is a Canadian politician.

Danielle Smith may also refer to:
Danielle Smith (volleyball) (born 1995), Canadian volleyball player

See also
Danielle Bassett (Danielle Smith Bassett, born 1981), American physicist and systems neuroscientist
Daniella Smith (born 1972), New Zealand former professional boxer